SWI/SNF-related matrix-associated actin-dependent regulator of chromatin subfamily A member 5 is a protein that in humans is encoded by the SMARCA5 gene.

Function 

The protein encoded by this gene is a member of the ISWI family of proteins. Members of this family have helicase and ATPase activities and are thought to regulate transcription of certain genes by altering the chromatin structure around those genes. The protein encoded by this gene is a component of the chromatin remodeling and spacing factor RSF, a facilitator of the transcription of class II genes by RNA polymerase II. The encoded protein is similar in sequence to the Drosophila ISWI chromatin remodeling protein.

Interactions 

SMARCA5 has been shown to interact with RAD21, Histone deacetylase 2, POLE3, SATB1 and BAZ1A.

References

Further reading